In mathematics, the Abel–Ruffini theorem (also known as Abel's impossibility theorem) states that there is no solution in radicals to general polynomial equations of degree five or higher with arbitrary coefficients. Here, general means that the coefficients of the equation are viewed and manipulated as indeterminates.

The theorem is named after Paolo Ruffini, who made an incomplete proof in 1799, (which was refined and completed in 1813 and accepted by Cauchy) and Niels Henrik Abel, who provided a proof in 1824.

Abel–Ruffini theorem refers also to the slightly stronger result that there are equations of degree five and higher that cannot be solved by radicals. This does not follow from Abel's statement of the theorem, but is a corollary of his proof, as his proof is based on the fact that some polynomials in the coefficients of the equation are not the zero polynomial. Galois theory implies also that 

is the simplest equation that cannot be solved in radicals, and that almost all polynomials of degree five or higher cannot be solved in radicals.

The impossibility of solving in degree five or higher contrasts with the case of lower degree: one has the quadratic formula, the cubic formula, and the quartic formula for degrees two, three, and four, respectively.

Context
Polynomial equations of degree two can be solved with the quadratic formula, which has been known since antiquity. Similarly the cubic formula for degree three, and the quartic formula for degree four, were found during the 16th century. At that time a fundamental problem was whether equations of higher degree could be solved in a similar way.

The fact that every polynomial equation of positive degree has solutions, possibly non-real, was asserted during the 17th century, but completely proved only at the beginning of the 19th century. This is the fundamental theorem of algebra, which does not provide any tool for computing exactly the solutions, although Newton's method allows approximating the solutions to any desired accuracy.

From the 16th century to beginning of the 19th century, the main problem of algebra was to search for a formula for the solutions of polynomial equations of degree five and higher, hence the name the "fundamental theorem of algebra". This meant a solution in radicals, that is, an expression involving only the coefficients of the equation, and the operations of addition, subtraction, multiplication, division, and th root extraction.

The Abel–Ruffini theorem proves that this is impossible. However, this impossibility does not imply that a specific equation of any degree cannot be solved in radicals. On the contrary, there are equations of any degree that can be solved in radicals. This is the case of the equation  for any , and the equations defined by cyclotomic polynomials, all of whose solutions can be expressed in radicals.

Abel's proof of the theorem does not explicitly contain the assertion that there are specific equations that cannot be solved by radicals. Such an assertion is not a consequence of Abel's statement of the theorem, as the statement does not exclude the possibility that "every particular quintic equation might be soluble, with a special formula for each equation." However, the existence of specific equations that cannot be solved in radicals seems to be a consequence of Abel's proof, as the proof uses the fact that some polynomials in the coefficients are not the zero polynomial, and, given a finite number of polynomials, there are values of the variables at which none of the polynomials takes the value zero.

Soon after Abel's publication of its proof, Évariste Galois introduced a theory, now called Galois theory that allows deciding, for any given equation, whether it is solvable in radicals (this is theoretical, as, in practice, this decision may need huge computation which can be difficult, even with powerful computers). This decision is done by introducing auxiliary polynomials, called resolvents, whose coefficients depend polynomially upon those of the original polynomial. The polynomial is solvable in radicals if and only if some resolvent has a rational root.

Proof
The proof of the Abel–Ruffini theorem predates Galois theory. However, Galois theory allows a better understanding of the subject, and modern proofs are generally based on it, while the original proofs of the Abel–Ruffini theorem are still presented for historical purposes.

The proofs based on Galois theory comprise four main steps: the characterization of solvable equations in terms of field theory; the use of the Galois correspondence between subfields of a given field and the subgroups of its Galois group for expressing this characterization in terms of solvable groups; the proof that the symmetric group is not solvable if its degree is five or higher; and the existence of polynomials with a symmetric Galois group.

Algebraic solutions and field theory
An algebraic solution of a polynomial equation is an expression involving the four basic arithmetic operations (addition, subtraction, multiplication, and division), and root extractions. Such an expression may be viewed as the description of a computation that starts from the coefficients of the equation to be solved and proceeds by computing some numbers, one after the other.

At each step of the computation, one may consider the smallest field that contains all numbers that have been computed so far. This field is changed only for the steps involving the computation of an th root.

So, an algebraic solution produces a sequence

of fields, and elements  such that 

For having normal extensions, which are fundamental for the theory, one must refine the sequence of fields as follows. If  does not contain all -th roots of unity, one introduces the field  that extends  by a primitive root of unity, and one redefines  as 

So, if one starts from a solution in terms of radicals, one gets an increasing sequence of fields such that the last one contains the solution, and each is a normal extension of the preceding one with a Galois group that is cyclic.

Conversely, if one has such a sequence of fields, the equation is solvable in terms of radicals. For proving this, it suffices to prove that a normal extension with a cyclic Galois group can be built from a succession of radical extensions.

Galois correspondence
The Galois correspondence establishes a one to one correspondence between the subextensions of a normal field extension  and the subgroups of the Galois group of the extension.

The preceding section shows that an equation is solvable in terms of radicals if and only if the Galois group of its splitting field (the smallest field that contains all the roots) is solvable, that is, it contains a sequence of subgroups such that each is normal in the preceding one, with a quotient group that is cyclic. (Solvable groups are commonly defined with abelian instead of cyclic quotient groups, but the fundamental theorem of finite abelian groups shows that the two definitions are equivalent).

So, for proving Abel–Ruffini theorem, it remains to prove that the symmetric group  is not solvable, and that there are polynomials with symmetric Galois group.

Solvable symmetric groups
For , the symmetric group  of degree  has only the alternating group  as a nontrivial normal subgroup (see ). For , the alternating group  is not abelian and simple (that is, it does not have any nontrivial normal subgroup). Thus, the Abel–Ruffini theorem results from the existence of polynomials with a symmetric Galois group; this will be shown in the next section.

Somehow, this explains the existence of the quadratic, cubic, and quartic formulas, since a major result of Galois theory is that a polynomial equation has a solution in radicals if and only if its Galois group is solvable (the term "solvable group" takes its origin from this theorem).

Polynomials with symmetric Galois groups

General equation
The general or generic polynomial equation of degree  is the equation

where  are distinct indeterminates.

For proving that the Galois group is  it is simpler to start from the roots. Let  be new indeterminates, aimed to be the roots, and consider the polynomial

It follows that the Galois group  is the symmetric group 

This means that one may consider  as a generic equation.

Explicit example

The equation  is not solvable in radicals, as will be explained below.

Let  be .
Numbering the roots lets one identify  with a subgroup of the symmetric group .
Because 5 is prime, any transposition and 5-cycle in  generate the whole group; see .  Thus .  Since the group  is not solvable, the equation  is not solvable in radicals.

Cayley's resolvent

Testing whether a specific quintic is solvable in radicals can be done by using Cayley's resolvent. This is a univariate polynomial of degree six whose coefficients are polynomials in the coefficients of a generic quintic. A specific irreducible quintic is solvable in radicals if and only, when its coefficients are substituted in Cayley's resolvent, the resulting sextic polynomial has a rational root.

History
Around 1770, Joseph Louis Lagrange began the groundwork that unified the many different tricks that had been used up to that point to solve equations, relating them to the theory of groups of permutations, in the form of Lagrange resolvents. This innovative work by Lagrange was a precursor to Galois theory, and its failure to develop solutions for equations of fifth and higher degrees hinted that such solutions might be impossible, but it did not provide conclusive proof. The first person who conjectured that the problem of solving quintics by radicals might be impossible to solve was Carl Friedrich Gauss, who wrote in 1798 in section 359 of his book Disquisitiones Arithmeticae (which would be published only in 1801) that "there is little doubt that this problem does not so much defy modern methods of analysis as that it proposes the impossible". The next year, in his thesis, he wrote "After the labors of many geometers left little hope of ever arriving at the resolution of the general equation algebraically, it appears more and more likely that this resolution is impossible and contradictory." And he added "Perhaps it will not be so difficult to prove, with all rigor, the impossibility for the fifth degree. I shall set forth my investigations of this at greater length in another place." Actually, Gauss published nothing else on this subject.

The theorem was first nearly proved by Paolo Ruffini in 1799. He sent his proof to several mathematicians to get it acknowledged, amongst them Lagrange (who did not reply) and Augustin-Louis Cauchy, who sent him a letter saying: "Your memoir on the general solution of equations is a work which I have always believed should be kept in mind by mathematicians and which, in my opinion, proves conclusively the algebraic unsolvability of general equations of higher than fourth degree." However, in general, Ruffini's proof was not considered convincing. Abel wrote: "The first and, if I am not mistaken, the only one who, before me, has sought to prove the impossibility of the algebraic solution of general equations is the mathematician Ruffini. But his memoir is so complicated that it is very difficult to determine the validity of his argument. It seems to me that his argument is not completely satisfying."

The proof also, as it was discovered later, was incomplete. Ruffini assumed that all radicals that he was dealing with could be expressed from the roots of the polynomial using field operations alone; in modern terms, he assumed that the radicals belonged to the splitting field of the polynomial. To see why this is really an extra assumption, consider, for instance, the polynomial . While Cauchy either did not notice Ruffini's assumption or felt that it was a minor one, most historians believe that the proof was not complete until Abel proved the theorem on natural irrationalities, which asserts that the assumption holds in the case of general polynomials.<ref
    name=    "Tignol_Abel"
/>
The Abel–Ruffini theorem is thus generally credited to Abel, who published a proof compressed into just six pages in 1824.<ref
    name=    "Abel1"
/>    (Abel adopted a very terse style to save paper and money: the proof was printed at his own expense.<ref
    name=    "Pesic"
/>)    A more elaborated version of the proof would be published in 1826.<ref
    name=    "Abel2"
/>

Proving that the general quintic (and higher) equations were unsolvable by radicals did not completely settle the matter, because the Abel–Ruffini theorem does not provide necessary and sufficient conditions for saying precisely which quintic (and higher) equations are unsolvable by radicals. Abel was working on a complete characterization when he died in 1829.

According to Nathan Jacobson, "The proofs of Ruffini and of Abel [...] were soon superseded by the crowning achievement of this line of research: Galois' discoveries in the theory of equations." In 1830, Galois (at the age of 18) submitted to the Paris Academy of Sciences a memoir on his theory of solvability by radicals, which was ultimately rejected in 1831 as being too sketchy and for giving a condition in terms of the roots of the equation instead of its coefficients. Galois was aware of the contributions of Ruffini and Abel, since he wrote "It is a common truth, today, that the general equation of degree greater than  cannot be solved by radicals... this truth has become common (by hearsay) despite the fact that geometers have ignored the proofs of Abel and Ruffini..." Galois then died in 1832 and his paper Mémoire sur les conditions de resolubilité des équations par radicaux remained unpublished until 1846, when it was published by Joseph Liouville accompanied by some of his own explanations. Prior to this publication, Liouville announced Galois' result to the academy in a speech he gave on 4 July 1843. A simplification of Abel's proof was published by Pierre Wantzel in 1845. When Wantzel published it, he was already aware of the contributions by Galois and he mentions that, whereas Abel's proof is valid only for general polynomials, Galois' approach can be used to provide a concrete polynomial of degree 5 whose roots cannot be expressed in radicals from its coefficients.

In 1963, Vladimir Arnold discovered a topological proof of the Abel–Ruffini theorem, which served as a starting point for topological Galois theory.

References

Articles containing proofs
Galois theory
Niels Henrik Abel
Solvable groups
Theorems about polynomials